Andrea Herzog (born 9 December 1999) is a German slalom canoeist who has competed at the international level since 2014.

Career 
She won three medals at the ICF Canoe Slalom World Championships with two golds in C1 (2019, 2022) and a silver in C1 team (2022). She has also won two silver and one bronze medal in the C1 team event at the European Championships.

At the delayed 2020 Summer Olympics in Tokyo, Herzog won a bronze medal in the C1 event.

Herzog won three consecutive Junior World Championships medals in the C1 event with two golds (2015, 2017) and one silver (2016).

Results

World Cup individual podiums

Complete World Cup results

References

External links

Living people
German female canoeists
1999 births
Medalists at the ICF Canoe Slalom World Championships
People from Meissen
Olympic canoeists of Germany
Medalists at the 2020 Summer Olympics
Canoeists at the 2020 Summer Olympics
Olympic medalists in canoeing
Olympic bronze medalists for Germany
Sportspeople from Saxony
20th-century German women
21st-century German women